Jeanne Kirkton (born October 11, 1953) is an American politician. She was a member of the Missouri House of Representatives from 2009 to 2017. She is a member of the Democratic party.

She was a member of the Webster Groves City Council from 2006 to 2008. She was a critical care nurse from 1973 to 1982 and a nurse anesthetist from 1982 to 1992.

Kirkton is a 1971 graduate of St. Charles High School. She has a degree in nursing from Maryville University (1973), a certificate from Barnes Hospital School of Nurse Anesthesia (1982), and a bachelor's degree in history and political science from Webster University (1996).

References

1953 births
21st-century American politicians
21st-century American women politicians
Living people
Maryville University alumni
Democratic Party members of the Missouri House of Representatives
Missouri city council members
People from Webster Groves, Missouri
Webster University alumni
Women city councillors in Missouri
Women state legislators in Missouri